The 2015 FIFA Ballon d'Or Gala was the sixth year for FIFA's awards for the top football players and coaches of the year. The awards were given out in Zürich, Switzerland on 11 January 2016.

Lionel Messi won the award as the World Player of the Year for the fifth time, extending his own record of five wins. Carli Lloyd was named as the Women's World Player of the Year, while Luis Enrique received the World Coach of the Year for Men's Football and Jill Ellis the World Coach of the Year for Women's Football.	

The ceremony was hosted by Kate Abdo and James Nesbitt.

Winners and nominees
In late October 2015, FIFA revealed shortlist for the FIFA Ballon d'Or, FIFA Women's World Player of the Year and FIFA World Coaches of the Year. The shortlists for the women's awards were revealed on 19 October and the men's on 20 October.

FIFA Ballon d'Or

The results for the 2015 FIFA Ballon d'Or were:

The following 20 men were originally in contention for the 2015 FIFA Ballon d'Or:

FIFA Puskás Award
The winner of the FIFA Puskás Award was:
 Wendell Lira ( Goianésia), 1–2 vs  Atlético Goianiense, Estádio Serra Dourada, 11 March 2015

The other nominees were:
 Lionel Messi ( Barcelona), 1–3 vs  Athletic Bilbao, Camp Nou, 30 May 2015
 Alessandro Florenzi ( Roma), 1–1 vs  Barcelona, Stadio Olimpico, 16 September 2015

FIFA/FIFPro World XI

FIFA Women's World Player of the Year
The results for the 2015 FIFA Women's World Player of the Year were:

The following 7 players were also named to the shortlist for the FIFA Women's World Player of the Year award:

FIFA World Coach of the Year for Men's Football
The following were the final 3 nominees for the FIFA World Coach of the Year for Men's Football:

The following 7 managers were also named to the shortlist for the FIFA World Coach of the Year for Men's Football:

FIFA World Coach of the Year for Women's Football
The following are the final 3 nominees for the FIFA World Coach of the Year for Women's Football:

The following 7 managers were also named to the shortlist for the FIFA World Coach of the Year for Women's Football:

References

External links
 

FIFA Ballon
FIFA Ballon d'Or
FIFA Ballon
Women's association football trophies and awards
2015 in women's association football